Karel la Fargue (1738–1793), was an 18th-century Dutch painter from the northern Netherlands.	
		
He was born in The Hague to Jan Thomas la Fargue and was the younger brother of Paulus Constantijn la Fargue. His other siblings Maria Margaretha, Jacob Elias and Isaac Lodewijk also became painters.	
In 1768 he became a member of the Confrerie Pictura, along with his brother Isaac.
He is known for topographical views like his older brother.  He died in The Hague.	

In 1998, over 200 years after his death he was unmasked as a prolific forger of seventeenth-century Dutch drawings all detailed in the Oud Holland Magazine.

References	
	

Karel la Fargue on Artnet	
	
	

1738 births
1793 deaths
18th-century Dutch painters
18th-century Dutch male artists
Dutch male painters
People from Voorburg
Painters from The Hague